Ridgewood, New York may refer to:

Ridgewood, Queens, in the borough of Queens in New York City
Ridgewood, Niagara County, New York, a hamlet in Niagara County, New York